Vile is the fifth studio album by American death metal band Cannibal Corpse. It was released on May 21, 1996 through Metal Blade Records. It is their first album to feature vocalist George Fisher and the last album featuring guitarist Rob Barrett until 2006's Kill. It was also the last Cannibal Corpse album to feature Scott Burns as producer. This album also marks the first time the band ever tuned down, from previously playing in Eb to Bb Standard, although a few of the songs on Vile are in Db.

The album was re-released in 2006 with new liner notes and a bonus DVD (titled "Vile Live") featuring a full concert from the Vile tour, during which many songs from the album are performed.

Vile was the first death metal album to appear on the Billboard 200 chart, debuting at No. 151.

Background
Vile was originally titled Created to Kill (which is featured in the Cannibal Corpse Box set) and had partially been completed with Chris Barnes on vocals. Before the album was released, Barnes was dismissed from the band, which then brought in Monstrosity vocalist George "Corpsegrinder" Fisher to finish the album's vocal work. Fisher re-recorded Barnes's vocal tracks and the band released the album under the new title Vile. Vile also features a brand new band logo since the previous logo had been drawn by the departing Chris Barnes.

During the Vile sessions, "The Undead Will Feast" from Eaten Back to Life was re-recorded with Fisher on vocals. This version of the song would first appear as the only bonus track on a Japanese import edition of Vile and then on the Worm Infested EP in 2003.

Reception

"Fisher brought a vocal dynamism and character that livened up the band's six-year-old sound. Fisher's ability to match the musical intensity and rhythm of Vile's more complicated assemblages of riffs created a more sophisticated yet equally tortuous essence." "Tracks like 'Devoured by Vermin' and 'Bloodlands' feature more complex, focused, and just plain interesting musical ideas as well as precise execution. Fans of death metal who haven't yet discovered Cannibal Corpse would be wise to give Vile an open-minded listen".

Track listing

Personnel

Cannibal Corpse
 George Fisher – vocals
 Rob Barrett – lead guitar
 Jack Owen – rhythm guitar
 Alex Webster – bass
 Paul Mazurkiewicz – drums

Production
 Scott Burns – engineer, mixing
 Mike Fuller – mastering
 Brian James – design
 Vincent Locke – artwork, illustrations
 Brian Slagel – executive producer

2007 Vile Live DVD track listing

February 3, 1997
"Perverse Suffering"
"Stripped, Raped and Strangled"
"Covered with Sores"
"Monolith"
"Addicted to Vaginal Skin"
"Force Fed Broken Glass"
"Fucked with a Knife"
"Gutted"
"Bloodlands"
"Shredded Humans"
"Staring Through the Eyes of the Dead"
"A Skull Full of Maggots"
"Devoured by Vermin"
"Hammer Smashed Face"

February 4, 1997
"Pulverized"
"Puncture Wound Massacre"
"Mummified in Barbed Wire"
"Orgasm Through Torture"

Created to Kill
Several of the songs from the finished album were written while Barnes was still in the band, and were recorded in demo form with his vocals. These tracks were collected for disc three of the 15 Year Killing Spree box set. They are:

 "Unburied Horror" – 3:28
 "Mummified in Barbed Wire" – 3:07
 "Gallery of the Obscene" – 3:37
 "To Kill Myself" – 3:41
 "Bloodlands" – 4:29
 "Puncture Wound Massacre" – 1:43
 "Devoured by Vermin" – 3:11

Chart positions

References

1996 albums
Cannibal Corpse albums
Metal Blade Records albums
Albums produced by Scott Burns (record producer)
Albums recorded at Morrisound Recording